Udham Singh (1899–1940) was an Indian revolutionary. Udham Singh may also refer to:

 Udham Singh (field hockey) (1928–2000), Indian Olympic field hockey player
 Udham Singh (Chhattisgarh Maoist) (died 2013), Indian Maoist militant